The Moyle Interconnector is a 500megawatt (MW) HVDC link between Scotland and Northern Ireland, running between Auchencrosh in Ayrshire and Ballycronan More in County Antrim. It went into service in 2001 and is owned and operated by Mutual Energy.

Specifications 
The Moyle Interconnector has a capacity of 500MW and is of dual monopole configuration. Each pole consists  of a coaxial 250kV DC cable with integrated return conductors (IRC), each cable having a transmission capacity of 250MW. The LV return conductor elements of the IRCs have suffered failures (see below), and their function was restored by laying new separate metallic return conductors (MRCs) in 2016. The converter stations are equipped with light-triggered thyristors. The converter stations were designed and constructed by Siemens, while the cables were manufactured by Nexans in Halden, Norway.

The converter station at Auchencrosh is connected via a  single-circuit 275kV overhead three-phase AC line, which is installed on delta-type pylon, to Coylton substation, where the connection with the high voltage grid of Great Britain takes place. The Ballycronan More converter station is connected into the Northern Ireland grid through two 275kV circuits.

Operating history
In August 2011, the interconnector went out of service. 
Repairs were made and the cable became operational again with 450MW in February 2012. 

However, further faults meant that a major part of the interconnector had to be taken out of service until it could be augmented with the additional LV return cables, completed in 2016. This restored capacity to the full 500MW.
This was carried out by Nexans (Norway) with the aid of Morrows (NI) and Romac Civil Engineering (NI).

In February 2017, the cable suffered another fault, halving capacity to 250MW. However full capacity was restored in September 2017, following repairs by Nexans.

A major refurbishment of the control and protection systems was undertaken in 2022; this was delivered pole by pole, allowing 250MW capacity to be maintained for most of the project. The new controls support enhanced ancillary services as well as more resilient operation in low fault level conditions.

Mutual Energy
Mutual Energy is a mutual company which manages the Moyle Interconnector (and some high pressure gas transmission assets including the Scotland-Northern Ireland Pipeline) for the benefit of Northern Ireland's energy consumers.

Economic aspects
Intraday capacity trading is not available, but is being discussed.

Since November 2017, exports to Scotland are limited to 80MW due to National Grid UK transmission constraints. However, two-day ahead projections of wind in Scotland are used to allow flows of up to 300MW. The 80MW constraint is expected to rise to 500MW by 2022.

Moyle also provides frequency support services to both Eirgrid and National Grid. These services provide for fast change of power flow in the event of a network disturbance on either the NI or Scotland transmission systems.

Sites

See also
East–West Interconnector
Scotland–Norway interconnector
BritNed
Greenlink

References

External links
 

 
 
 
 
 

Electrical interconnectors to and from Great Britain
Electrical interconnectors to and from the island of Ireland
HVDC transmission lines
Electric power infrastructure in Scotland
Electric power infrastructure in Northern Ireland
Scottish coast
Buildings and structures in South Ayrshire
Buildings and structures in County Antrim
2001 establishments in Northern Ireland
2001 establishments in Scotland